Corey Lee Palumbo (born August 16, 1972) is an American attorney and politician who represented the 17th district of the West Virginia Senate from January 14, 2009 until December 1, 2020. He previously served as a member of the West Virginia House of Delegates from 2003 to 2009. Palumbo did not run for reelection in the November 3, 2020 general election and was succeeded by West Virginia State Delegate Eric Nelson. Nelson was officially sworn in on December 1, 2020, before Palumbo's term was due to end.

He is the son of Mario Palumbo, the 32nd Attorney General of West Virginia as well as a former five-term state senator. Palumbo graduated from West Virginia University in 1994, and graduated from University of North Carolina's law school in 1998. He was hired as an attorney for Bowles, Rice, McDavid, Graff and Love that same year.

External links

West Virginia Legislature - Senator Corey Palumbo
Project Vote Smart profile

|-

1972 births
Living people
Democratic Party West Virginia state senators
21st-century American politicians